Wolf Werner (8 April 1942 – 29 June 2018) was a German football player and manager who played as a midfielder.

Career
Werner managed Bundesliga club Borussia Mönchengladbach between 1987 and 1989. He was coach of SV Wilhelmshaven from 1992 and 1996. From 1996 to 2007 he worked for Werder Bremen as director of the youth academy and as a coach. During his tenure, the club's U19 won the German under 19 football championship in 1998–99 and came second in 1999–2000. From 2007 he was sporting director at Fortuna Düsseldorf, also working as interim coach. He resigned in 2014.

Personal life
In the years before his death Werner lived in Wilhelmshaven. He died on 29 June 2018 while on holiday in Schleswig-Holstein, aged 76.

References

1942 births
2018 deaths
German footballers
Association football midfielders
German football managers
Borussia Mönchengladbach managers
FC Bayern Munich II managers
SV Wilhelmshaven managers
SV Werder Bremen II managers
Fortuna Düsseldorf managers